ViEWER, the Virtual Environment Workbench for Education and Research, is a proprietary, freeware computer program for Microsoft Windows written by researchers at the University of Idaho for the study of visual perception and complex immersive three-dimensional environments.

It was created using C++ and OpenGL, and has been used by Dr. Brian Dyre, Dr. Steffen Werner, Dr. Ernesto Bustamante, Dr. Ben Barton, and their undergraduate and graduate researchers in visual perception, signal detection, and child-safety experiments.

References

External links
, Archived

Graphics software
Scientific simulation software
Windows graphics-related software
Science software for Windows